Paul Sanders may refer to:

Paul Sanders (historian) (born 1967), British historian
Paul Sanders (politician) (born c. 1927), American politician
Paul Sanders (athlete) (born 1962), British athlete